Eugène Joseph Delporte (10 January 1882 – 19 October 1955) was a Belgian astronomer born in Genappe.

He discovered a total of sixty-six asteroids. Notable discoveries include 1221 Amor (which lent its name to the Amor asteroids) and the Apollo asteroid 2101 Adonis. He discovered or co-discovered some comets as well, including periodic comet 57P/du Toit-Neujmin-Delporte. He worked in the Observatoire Royal de Belgique (Belgian Royal Observatory), situated in the town of Uccle (after which the asteroid 1276 Ucclia is named). He started there in 1903 after receiving his doctorate that year from the Free University of Brussels.

In 1930 he drew the modern boundaries between all of the constellations in the sky, along lines of right ascension and declination for the epoch B1875.0.

The Florian asteroid 1274 Delportia (discovered by himself) and the lunar impact crater Delporte were named after him.

List of discovered minor planets

References 
 

1882 births
1955 deaths
20th-century Belgian astronomers
Discoverers of asteroids
Discoverers of comets